Deceived is a 1991 American psychological thriller film directed by Damian Harris.  The script was written by Mary Agnes Donoghue and rewritten by Bruce Joel Rubin. Goldie Hawn and John Heard star as a happily married couple whose lives are disrupted when secrets from the past are revealed.

Plot
Adrienne Saunders is happily married to her art dealer husband, Jack.  They have a daughter named Mary. After the local museum curator is mysteriously murdered, Jack falls under suspicion of selling forged treasures to the museum. Jack has to suddenly go to Boston on a work related trip, but Adrienne hears from a friend that she thought she saw Jack in town.  Adrienne confronts him, but he denies being in town.  As pressure mounts on Jack over a forged relic, Adrienne receives word from the police that Jack died in a car accident.  In trying to wrap up Jack's affairs, Adrienne begins to suspect that her husband was not who he claimed to be.  When she sees a high school yearbook picture of her husband attributed to a man named Frank Sullivan, she realizes that she has been deceived.

She tracks down Jack's cousin, Evelyn, who confirms that Frank and Jack were inseparable in high school. After Jack died, she never saw Frank again. Evelyn explains that Frank's father was an alcoholic and that his mother worked as a toll booth operator. She directs Adrienne to Frank's mother, who lives in a rundown Brooklyn apartment. Frank's mother, Rosalie, bitterly receives the news of her granddaughter, telling Adrienne that Frank was always selfish and never looked in on her.

A stalker lurks at Adrienne's loft. He comes in to Adrienne's bed while she is asleep and caresses her. He watches Mary, who is spooked by the man in her room at night. One day, as the housekeeper finishes her chores, she surprises the stalker. He leaves her almost dead in the bathroom and ransacks the apartment.

At work, Adrienne gets an urgent message from Mrs. Sullivan and rushes to her apartment. When she arrives, the door is open, and Mrs. Sullivan is nowhere to be found. "Jack" appears, and Adrienne slaps him for his cruelty. Jack explains that when his friend died, he was distraught and fell into Jack's identity during the mourning process. He reveals that a man named Dan Sherman is blackmailing him. Jack faked his death to escape, knowing that he would have to give up his life with Adrienne and Mary. He tells her that Sherman is insistent on having an Egyptian necklace in their apartment, and he asks Adrienne to look for it. As she leaves the apartment, Jack watches her from the window beside the body of his murdered mother.

During her search for the necklace, Adrienne discovers a Parks Department photo ID. It bears her husband's picture and the name Dan Sherman. She tracks down an address and pays a surprise visit to the house. A pregnant Mrs. Sherman is on the phone and lets her in, thinking she is with a moving company. Adrienne looks around the house and sees wedding pictures of her husband with Mrs. Sherman. In a photo album, she sees a picture of Mary, who Mrs. Sherman says is her husband's dead sister. The person on the phone is Jack, who asks her to give the phone to Adrienne.

He congratulates Adrienne on tracking down his new life and reveals that he has kidnapped Mary. Mary traded the necklace to another girl, and Jack instructs Adrienne to retrieve it and meet him at their loft to exchange Mary for the necklace. At the loft, Adrienne asks to see Mary, and Jack explains that she is downstairs playing in the car. When Adrienne tries to go see her, Jack pins her against a wall and demands the necklace first. Adrienne stabs him and flees. After a long chase throughout a construction area, Jack corners her in the freight elevator. He reveals his true nature as always doing "what comes next" to preserve himself. Adrienne lures Jack into the elevator shaft, where he falls to his death; Adrienne had been holding on to an unseen elevator cable to give the illusion of being in the elevator car. Later, Adrienne and Mary pack up to move out of the loft and start a new life somewhere else.

Cast

 Goldie Hawn as Adrienne Saunders
 John Heard as Frank Sullivan / Jack Saunders / Dan Sherman
 Robin Bartlett as Charlotte, Adrienne's Business Partner
 Ashley Peldon as Mary Saunders
 Beatrice Straight as Adrienne's Mother
 George R. Robertson as Adrienne's Father
 Tom Irwin as Harvey Schwartz
 Jan Rubeš as Tomasz
 Anais Granofsky as Ellen
 Heidi Von Palleske as Mrs. Peabody
 Stanley Anderson as Detective Kinsella
 Francesca Butler as Lillian
 Bruce MacVittie as Social Security Man
 Amy Wright as Evelyn Saunders
 Kate Reid as Rosalie Sullivan

Production 
Shooting took place in Toronto from January 22 until April 16, 1991.  Mary Agnes Donoghue wrote the initial screenplay.  Donoghue was inspired by the thought of having a safe, middle-class life turn out to be a complete lie.  When Donoghue declined to make changes to the script, Bruce Joel Rubin was hired, under the pen name "Derek Saunders".

Box office

The film opened at number 3 in the US and grossed $4.3 million in its first week. Its final gross in the US was $28.7 million.

Reception 
Deceived gained a 38% approval rating on Rotten Tomatoes based on 21 reviews; the average rating is 5/10.  Reviewers criticized the film for its illogical and predictable plot.  Roger Ebert wrote, "Deceived opens with an ancient thriller formula, elevates itself to passages of genuine suspense, and then ends with a climax so absurd that it takes a real effort of memory to recall that parts of the movie were really pretty good."

Audiences polled by CinemaScore gave the film an average grade of "A-" on an A+ to F scale.

References

External links

 
 
 

1990s mystery thriller films
1990s psychological thriller films
American mystery thriller films
American psychological thriller films
1990s English-language films
Films set in New York City
Films shot in Toronto
Touchstone Pictures films
Films scored by Thomas Newman
Films with screenplays by Bruce Joel Rubin
Matricide in fiction
Films directed by Damian Harris
1990s American films